The following is a list of naturally occurring lakes and other water bodies in Victoria, Australia; outside the Greater Melbourne area, in alphabetical order, for those lakes with a surface area greater than :

See also

 Lakes and Reservoirs in Melbourne

References

Victoria
Victoria
Lakes